Tetragonia coronata is a member of the genus Tetragonia and is endemic to Australia.

The annual herb has a decumbent habit. It blooms in July producing yellow flowers.

Often found among calcrete outcrops it has a scattered distribution throughout the Gascoyne region of Western Australia where it grows in clay loam soils.

References

coronata
Flora of Western Australia
Plants described in 1996
Taxa named by Barbara Lynette Rye
Taxa named by Malcolm Eric Trudgen